Rebecca Lee Lok Sze, MH (Traditional Chinese: 李樂詩, born 1944 in Canton) is an explorer from Hong Kong. She is the first Hong Kong person and the first woman to have visited the North Pole, the South Pole, and Mount Everest. She has visited the Yarlung Tsangpo Canyon (the deepest canyon in China) and the Taklamakan (the hottest desert in China).

Life and work
Dr Lee has worked as a professional graphic designer, painter, photographer, and writer. In 1985 she joined the Chinese National Antarctic Expedition and first set foot on Antarctica. Over the following 30 years Dr Lee has made significant contributions toward polar exploration and educating people about environmental impacts. In 1997 she founded the Polar Museum Foundation.  Dr Lee has donated a collection of artifacts from her polar expeditions to the Museum of Climate Change at the Chinese University of Hong Kong. In 2012 she collaborated with the Hong Kong Philharmonic Orchestra on a performance of the Sinfonia antartica by Ralph Vaughan Williams.

Dr Lee is currently the Honorary Adviser of the Hong Kong Institute of Vocational Education (Chai Wan), Science Adviser of the Hong Kong Leisure and Cultural Services Department and Vice Chairman of the Scout Association of Hong Kong Programme Committee.

Awards and honours
Doctor of Humanities, honoris causa, by Lingnan University (Hong Kong) in 2000
Awarded the Medal of Honour by the Hong Kong SAR Government in 2008
Awarded an Honorary Fellowship of The Hong Kong Polytechnic University in 2009
Doctor of Humanities awarded by The Hong Kong Institute of Education in 2012
Awarded an Honorary Fellowship of The Chinese University of Hong Kong in 2013

References

External links 
 Rebecca Lee discusses lessons from her life
 Rebecca Lee talks about the Sinfonia antartica performance

Chinese explorers
Living people
1944 births
Members of the Selection Committee of Hong Kong
Members of the Society of Woman Geographers